Vukobratović is a Serbian surname, derived from the male given name Vukobrat. Notable people with the surname include:

Dragomir Vukobratović (b. 1988), Serbian footballer
Lana Vukobratović (b. 1954), Serbian film editor
Miomir Vukobratović (1931–2012), Serbian roboticist

Serbian surnames